Slobodan Kuljanin (28 November 1953 – 22 February 2019) was a Bosnian Serb footballer and coach.

He died on 22 February 2019 after a short but severe illness. He was a long-time assistant coach to Aleksandar Stanojević.

Honours

As assistant coach
Partizan
Serbian SuperLiga: 2009–10, 2010–11
Serbian Cup: 2010–11

References

External links
 

1953 births
2019 deaths
Sportspeople from Mostar
Serbs of Bosnia and Herzegovina
Serbian footballers
Serbian football managers
Yugoslav First League players
Association football defenders
FK Borac Banja Luka players
FK Kozara Gradiška players
FK Partizan non-playing staff